Bernice E. Edwell (1880–1962), was an Australian painter specializing in miniatures. She was a founding member of the Sydney Society of Women Painters and the Twenty Melbourne Painters.

Biography
Edwell was born on 11 May 1880 in Newbury, England. She was the half-sister of Mary Edwell-Burke.

She studied at the Royal Art Society of New South Wales, where she was taught by Frank P. Mahony. She also travel to Paris where she studied for about 16 months around the turn of the century.

Edwell established herself in Sydney, then Melbourne as a miniaturist. She won first prize for her miniatures at the Women's Work Exhibition at Melbourne in 1907. In 1910 Edwell was involved in the creation of the New South Wales Society of Women Painters. The same year they held their first exhibition displaying the work of 57 women. From 1908 to 1912 Edwell exhibited at The Society of Arts and Crafts of NSW. In 1919 Edwell was a founding member of the Twenty Melbourne Painters Society.

Along with several solo shows in Melbourne from 1915 through 1934, Edwell was included in a 1923 group show with A.M.E. Bale and Jo Sweatman at the Melbourne Athenaeum.

Edwell died in 1962 in Sydney.

References

External links
Images of works by Bernice E. Edwell on Art Gallery of New South Wales

1880 births
1962 deaths
20th-century Australian women artists
20th-century Australian painters
Australian women painters
Portrait miniaturists
People from Newbury, Berkshire
English emigrants to Australia
Artists from Sydney
Artists from Melbourne
Australian portrait painters